SV Union Halle-Neustadt e.V. is a German women's handball team from Halle (Saxony-Anhalt). They compete in the Handball-Bundesliga Frauen, the top division in Germany.

Team

Current squad
Squad for the 2022–23 season.

Goalkeepers
 12  Anica Gudelj
 16  Thara Sieg
 99  Lara-Sophie Lepschi
Wingers
LW
 98  Marija Gudelj
RW
 7  Franziska Fischer
 8  Judith Tietjen
Line players
 5  Edita Nukovic
 13  Madeleine Östlund

Back players
LB
 6  Janne-Lotta Woch
 10  Simone Spur Pedersen
 44  Julia Niewiadomska
CB
 15  Cecilie Woller 
 20  Maxime Struijs
 29  Alexandra Lundström	
 75  Vanessa Dierks
RB
 24  Helena Mikkelsen
 26  Cara Reuthal

Transfers

Transfers for the season 2023–24

 Joining

 Leaving

References

External links
 Official site

German handball clubs
Handball clubs established in 1970
Women's handball clubs
Women's handball in Germany
Sport in Halle (Saale)